The 2022–23 EHF European Cup is the 26th season of Europe's tertiary club handball tournament organised by European Handball Federation (EHF), and the 3rd season since it was renamed from the Challenge Cup to the EHF European Cup.

Qualified teams
The full list of teams qualified for each stage of the 2022–23 EHF European Cup was announced on 12 July 2022.

The labels in the parentheses show how each team qualified for the place of its starting round:
EC: European Cup title holders
CW: Cup winners
CR: Cup runners-up
4th, 5th, etc.: League position of the previous season
SF: Semi-final league position
QF: Quarter-final league position

Qualifying rounds

Round 1
A total of 26 teams are involved in the first qualifying round. The first leg matches were held on 10–11 September 2022, while the second leg matches were held on 17–18 September 2022. The draw was held in EHF office in Vienna.

Results

|}

Round 2
A total of 64 teams were involved in the second qualifying round, 13 teams advancing from the previous round and 51 teams entering this round. The first leg matches were held on 29–30 October 2022, while the second leg matches were held on 5–6 November 2022. The draw was held in EHF office in Vienna.

Results

|}

Round 3
A total of 32 teams were involved in the third qualifying round. The first leg matches were held on 3–4 December 2022, while the second leg matches were held on 10–11 December 2022. The draw was held in EHF office in Vienna.

Results

|}

Last 16
The first leg matches were held on 11–12 February 2023, while the second leg matches were held on 18–19 February 2023. The draw was held in EHF office in Vienna.

Results

|}

Quarterfinals
The first leg matches will be held on 18–19 March 2023, while the second leg matches will be held on 25–26 March 2023. The draw was held in EHF office in Vienna.

|}

Semifinals
The first leg matches will be held on 15–16 April 2023, while the second leg matches will be held on 22–23 April 2023. The draw was held in EHF office in Vienna.

|}

See also
2022–23 EHF Champions League
2022–23 EHF European League
2022–23 Women's EHF Champions League
2022–23 Women's EHF European League
2022–23 Women's EHF European Cup

References

External links
Official website

EHF European Cup
EHF European Cup
EHF European Cup
Current handball seasons